Pleasanton High School is a public high school located in Pleasanton, Texas (USA)  and classified as a 4A school by the UIL. It is part of the Pleasanton Independent School District located in central Atascosa County. In 2013, the school was rated "Met Standard" by the Texas Education Agency.

Academic Departments 
The high school offers the following Academic Departments

 Aerie Lab
 Agriculture
 Art
 Athletics
 Band
 Business
 Choir
 CTE
 Culinary 
 English Language Art
 Health Careers
 Lifeskills
 Math
 Physical Education
 Science
 Social Studies
 Special Education
 Theatre Arts

Athletics
The Pleasanton Eagles compete in the following sports 

Baseball
Basketball
Cross Country
Football
Golf
Powerlifting
Soccer
Softball
Tennis
Track and Field
Volleyball

References

External links
 

Schools in Atascosa County, Texas
Public high schools in Texas